Oh, What a Life is the debut studio album by American indie rock band American Authors. The album was released by Island Def Jam label Mercury Records on March 3, 2014. The album serves as a replacement to the band's eponymous 2013 extended play, American Authors.

Background
American Authors first formed in 2006 in Boston, Massachusetts as The Blue Pages. The members of the band first met at the Berklee College of Music. The Blue Pages, after relocating to New York City, New York, recorded and independently released two extended plays, Anthropology in February 2011, and Rich With Love in January 2012, as name-your-price albums on online music store Bandcamp.

In 2012, The Blue Pages changed their name to American Authors. Their debut single, "Believer," garnered attention through alternative rock radio. In January 2013, the band were signed to Mercury Records.

Reception

Critical

Soundtrack appearances
"Best Day of My Life" was featured in a Lowe's television advertisement in the United States, a Hyundai television advertisement in the United Kingdom, a Telecom New Zealand advertisement, a trailer for the film Delivery Man, an MLB Fan Cave commercial and is the title music of Sky Sports News' My Special Day feature. It is also featured in the movie The Secret Life of Walter Mitty, Konami video game Pro Evolution Soccer 2015 and the opening sequence for ESPN's 2013 World Series of Poker coverage.
"Hit It" is featured on EA Sports game, FIFA 14. 
"Home" was featured in a movie trailer for the movie This Is Where I Leave You and in a video honoring troops and their families.
"Oh, What a Life" was featured in the opening montage of the 2014 ESPY Awards.

Track listing
All songs written by Zac Barnett, James Shelley, Dave Rublin, Matthew Sanchez, Shep Goodman, and Aaron Accetta, except where noted. All tracks produced by Goodman and Accetta.

Personnel
American Authors
 Zac Barnett – lead and background vocals, guitar, additional production
 James Adam Shelley – guitar, banjo, mandolin, background vocals, additional production
 Dave Rublin – bass guitar, background vocals, additional production
 Matt Sanchez – drums, percussion, background vocals, additional production

Additional personnel

 Aaron Accetta – production, background vocals (all tracks); mixing (1, 3), engineering (1–7, 11)
 Shep Goodman – production, background vocals (all tracks); mixing (1, 3), engineering (1–7, 11)
 Mark Needham – mixing (2, 4–11)
 Chris Gehringer – mastering
 Joe Costable – engineering (8–10), engineering assistance (2, 4–7, 11)
 JC Santalis – engineering assistance (2, 5, 8–11)
 Jay Fallon – engineering assistance (2, 5, 8–11)
 Will Brierre – mixing assistance (2, 4–11)
 Steven Defino – art direction, design, cover photo
 Meredith Truax – cover photo, photography
 Sharon Lamb – photography, art coordination
 Andrew Zaeh – photography
 Andy Proctor – package production
 Peter Blume – horn arrangement (11)
 Erica Swindell – string arrangement (11)

Charts

Weekly charts

Year-end charts

Certifications

References

2014 debut albums
Mercury Records albums
American Authors albums
Island Records albums
Albums produced by Aaron Accetta
Albums produced by Shep Goodman